Angel Street may refer to:
Angel Street (play), the American title of Gas Light, a 1938 play by the British dramatist Patrick Hamilton
Angel Street (TV series), an American crime drama television series
Angel Street, London